Nina Elisabet Persson (born 6 September 1974) is the lead singer and lyricist for the Swedish rock band The Cardigans. She has also worked as a solo artist, releasing two albums as A Camp and one under her own name, and has also appeared as a guest artist with several other acts.

Career

Persson made her acting debut in the film Om Gud vill which was released in 2006.

She appears on the Manic Street Preachers song "Your Love Alone Is Not Enough", which reached #2 on the UK chart, on the album Send Away the Tigers. She also features on the 2009 Sparklehorse/Danger Mouse collaboration Dark Night of the Soul singing "Daddy's Gone".

Persson's first solo album released under her own name, Animal Heart, was released on 10 February 2014 on the independent British record label Lojinx Records.

In October 2022, Domino Recording Company posted a single by James Yorkston, Persson and The Secondhand Orchestra called "Hold Out For Love."  The track was "from the forthcoming album 'The Great White Sea Eagle.' She worked with James Yorkston and Karl-Jonas Winqvist of The Second Hand Orchestra on that album in Malmo. She was touring in the UK with them in 2022 and 2023. 

She has said that the Cardigans may reform occasionally to play together, but there are no plans to work in a studio to create new music together.

Personal life
Persson grew up in Jönköping, Sweden. "I grew up in a middle-class, academic family," Persson said in 2014. "I lived in a villa with a garden. I had two younger brothers."

She did not want to be a musician growing up, having an interest in art instead, which resulted in her attending art school. "I never really strived to be a musician; I was just, sort of, recruited into this band. I was bored out of my mind in this small, safe place (Jönköping). I was like, 'Awesome, I get to hang with fun guys.'"
 
On 16 June 2001, Persson married American songwriter and author Nathan Larson.

Persson was diagnosed with cervical cancer in 2009, and underwent surgical treatment.

After three attempts at in vitro fertilization, their son Nils was born on 30 September 2010.  For several years the family resided in Harlem, New York City, but in 2015 they decided to relocate to Malmö, the former base of the Cardigans. In an interview with Swedish daily Dagens Nyheter in March 2018, Persson talked about her expatriate years, the return to Sweden and pointed out that the return to her native country was family business and did not reflect any wish to reboot her old band.

Discography

Studio albums

Singles
 1996: "Desafinado" (Japanese-only release)
 2000: "Theme from 'Randall & Hopkirk (Deceased)", Nina Persson & David Arnold (#49 on UK singles chart)
 2007: "Your Love Alone Is Not Enough", Manic Street Preachers feat. Nina Persson (#2 on UK singles chart)
 2014: "Animal Heart"
 2014: "Sometimes"
 2015: "The Legacy (Theme Song)"
 2018: "Var ligger Sverige?" (feat. Thomas Öberg, Moto Boy & !Regeringen)
 2018: "Ligg Lågt" (feat. Thomas Öberg, Moto Boy, !Regeringen & Selma Modéer Wiking)

Soundtracks
 2014: "Tänk Om... Musiken Från Filmen"
 2015: "What if... (Original Motion Picture Soundtrack What if...)"

Collaborations and soundtrack appearances

Other appearances

In December 2022, Persson appeared in a web exclusive  of Last Week Tonight with John Oliver, disposing of plastic dolls by feeding them to a talking garbage can.

See also
The Cake Sale

References

External links

 
 My City, My Life interview with Nina Persson on CNN, January 2009

1974 births
Living people
Women rock singers
Swedish pop singers
The Cardigans members
People from Jönköping
Swedish expatriates in the United States
English-language singers from Sweden
Lojinx artists
21st-century Swedish women singers
21st-century Swedish singers
A Camp members